Lola Clementine Kirke (born 27 September 1990) is a British-American actress and singer-songwriter. She starred in the 2015 film Mistress America and the Amazon Studios television series Mozart in the Jungle. She appeared in Gone Girl (2014), Gemini (2017), and Lost Girls (2020) among other films. Recent work includes HBO's Winning Time (2022) and upcoming Showtime limited series Three Women.

Early life and family
Kirke was born in Westminster, London, and raised in New York City from the age of five. Her father, Simon Kirke, was drummer for the rock bands Bad Company and Free. Her mother is Lorraine (née Dellal) Kirke, the owner of Geminola, a vintage boutique in New York City that supplied a number of outfits for the television series Sex and the City. ("Geminola" is an amalgam of the names of Lola and her siblings.) Kirke graduated from Saint Ann's School in Brooklyn and in 2012 from Bard College.

Her father is of English and Scottish descent (the Kirkes being a junior branch of a family of Nottinghamshire landed gentry, and descending also from the Gibson-Craig baronets) and her mother is Jewish. Kirke's maternal grandfather, Jack Dellal, was a British businessman of Iraqi-Jewish descent, and her maternal grandmother Zehava Helmer was a former Israeli stewardess; Kirke has described herself as Jewish. Kirke has two older sisters, singer Domino Kirke and actress Jemima Kirke, and an older half-brother from a previous relationship of her mother's. She is a cousin of curator Alexander Dellal, shoe designer Charlotte Olympia Dellal, and model Alice Dellal.

Career
Kirke's breakout role came as the main character Hayley Rutledge in the Amazon series Mozart in the Jungle. It ran for four seasons, from 2014 to 2018. In 2014, she had a supporting role in the David Fincher film Gone Girl, before going on to star in Mistress America alongside Greta Gerwig. In 2017, Kirke starred opposite Zoe Kravitz in the Neon film Gemini, a neo-noir mystery film set in Hollywood, which made its world premiere at South By Southwest on March 12, 2017. In 2018 she starred in the drama film Untogether, playing sisters with her real-life sister Jemima Kirke. It premiered at the 2018 Tribeca Film Festival. She appears in the mystery drama Lost Girls, which made its premiere at The Sundance Film Festival in 2020, and was later made available on Netflix. In 2021, Kirke starred in the BJ Novak anthology series The Premise for FX and Hulu. Kirke appears in the HBO series about the Los Angeles Lakers, Winning Time, and will be seen in the Showtime drama series Three Women, based on Lisa Taddeo’s book of the same name.

Kirke is also active in music. In 2016 she released an EP. In 2018, she released three singles, including two with accompanying music videos, "Monster" and "Supposed To". Her debut album, Heart Head West, was released on 10 August 2018 by Downtown Records.

On 12 March 2019, Kirke released a cover of Rick Danko's "Sip the Wine" on Downtown Records, produced by Matthew E. White at his Richmond, Virginia studio, Spacebomb Studios.
In October 2021, Kirke was signed to Third Man Records. 

In April 2022, they released her sophomore LP Lady for Sale.  The album was hailed as "pure delight" by Pitchfork, "immediately iconic" by AllMusic, and was said to bridge "the gap that once existed between Madonna and the Mandrell Sisters," by Uncut Magazine. "A new era of sparkle-country is upon us," declared No Depression.  "Lola Kirke is here to usher it in." "Lyrically, Kirke moves into the top tier of writers," wrote The Line of Best Fit.  

In August 2022, it was announced that Kirke would be supporting Swedish folk duo First Aid Kit on their UK Tour in November and December 2022.

Kirke is an activist for women's rights. In 2017 she notably wore a "Fuck Paul Ryan" pin on her gown to the Golden Globes to protest the defunding of Planned Parenthood.

Filmography

Film

Television

Discography 

 EP (2016)
 Heart Head West (2018)
 Lady for Sale (2022)

References

External links

1990 births
Living people
21st-century American actresses
21st-century American singers
21st-century American women singers
21st-century English actresses
21st-century English women singers
21st-century English singers
Actresses from London
Actresses from New York City
American feminists
American film actresses
American people of Iraqi-Jewish descent
American people of Israeli descent
American people of Scottish descent
American Sephardic Jews
American stage actresses
American television actresses
Bard College alumni
British people of Iraqi-Jewish descent
British people of Israeli descent
Downtown Records artists
English Ashkenazi Jews
English emigrants to the United States
English feminists
English people of Iraqi-Jewish descent
English people of Israeli descent
English people of Scottish descent
English women singer-songwriters
Free (band)
Jewish English actresses
American Mizrahi Jews
People from Westminster
Saint Ann's School (Brooklyn) alumni
Chopard Trophy for Female Revelation winners